The following is the final results of the 1967 World Wrestling Championships. Freestyle competition were held in New Delhi, India and Greco-Roman competition were held in Bucharest, Romania.

Medal table

Team ranking

Medal summary

Men's freestyle

Men's Greco-Roman

References
UWW Database

External links
XVII Free Style World Wrestling Championships 1967 : Official Souvenir

World Wrestling Championships
W
W
1967 in sport wrestling
1967 in Indian sport
1967 in Romanian sport